Edgar Otto (1873–1952) was a Norwegian admiral.

He was born in Horten. He was a naval officer from 1894, and reached the ranks of Premier Lieutenant in 1897, Captain in 1901, Captain Commander in 1915, Commander in 1929 and Rear Admiral in 1934. In the Admiral Staff he was a member from 1911 to 1915, chief of staff from 1919 to 1925 and 1930 to 1933, and Chief from 1933 to 1934. From 1934 to 1938 he served as the Commanding Admiral in Norway.

References

1873 births
1952 deaths
Royal Norwegian Navy admirals
People from Horten